Merklín is a municipality and village in Karlovy Vary District in the Karlovy Vary Region of the Czech Republic. It has about 900 inhabitants.

Administrative parts
Villages of Lípa, Oldřiš and Pstruží are administrative parts of Merklín.

Reference

Villages in Karlovy Vary District
Villages in the Ore Mountains